Lifting equipment, also known as lifting gear, is a general term for any equipment that can be used to lift and lower loads. Types of lifting equipment include heavy machinery such as the patient lift, overhead cranes, forklifts, jacks, building cradles, and passenger lifts, and can also include smaller accessories such as chains, hooks, and rope. Generally, this equipment is used to move material that cannot be moved with manual labor, and are tools used in most work environments, such as warehouses, and is a requirement for most construction projects, such as bridges and buildings. This equipment can also be used to equip a larger number of packages and goods, requiring less persons to move material. Lifting equipment includes any form of equipment that is used for vertical lifting, and equipment used to move material horizontally is not considered lifting equipment, nor is equipment designed to support. As lifting equipment can be dangerous to use, it is a common subject of safety regulations in most countries, and heavy machinery usually requires certified workers to limit workplace injury.

Safety Issues 
Failure or misuse of heavy machinery can lead to severe or fatal injury, leading regulations to be one of the largest debates in labor laws across the world. Each country sets its own regulations, and enforces different aspects of workplace safety when using lifting equipment.

In the United States 
The Occupational Safety and Health Administration sets regulations for all equipment. Contractors are forced to uphold usually strict rules to ensure safety of workers. All machinery is required to be developed by a certified engineer, contractors must follow manufacturer procedures, all users be professionally trained before operating equipment, and equipment must be inspected regularly.

In the United Kingdom 
The Health and Safety Executive sets regulations on equipment in the United Kingdom, under the Lifting Operations and Lifting Equipment Regulations. These regulations require equipment be registered on a Statutory Inspection Report Form, is adequate for the task, be subject to routine inspection, and the use of the equipment be properly planned out.

See also 
 
 Crane
 Forklift
 Lewis (lifting appliance)
 Overhead crane
 Patient lift
 Safe working load
 Simple machine

References

 
Machines